Gursum is a woreda in Somali Region, Ethiopia. Part of the Fafan Zone, Gursum is bordered on the south by Babille, on the west by the Oromia Region, on the north by Ajersagora, on the east by Jijiga, and on the southeast by Kebri Beyah. Information is not available on the towns of this woreda.

Demographics 
Based on the 2007 Census conducted by the Central Statistical Agency of Ethiopia (CSA), this woreda has a total population of 27,510, of whom 14,815 are men and 12,695 women. While 2,970 or 10.8% are urban inhabitants, a further 2,028 or 7.37% are pastoralists. 98.79% of the population said they were Muslim. This woreda is primarily inhabited by Akisho sub clan of the Dir clan.

The 1994 national census reported a total population for this woreda of 11,106, of whom 5,679 were men and 5,427 were women; the census identified no urban inhabitants. The largest ethnic group reported in Gursum was the Somali people (99.14%).

Notes 

Districts of Somali Region